Lamberto Bava (born 3 April 1944) is an Italian film director. Born in Rome, Bava began working as an assistant director for his director father Mario Bava. Lamberto co-directed the 1979 television film La Venere d'Ille with his father and in 1980 directed his first solo feature film Macabre.

Bava continued working in the 1980s and collaborated with Dario Argento on films such as Demons. After 1990, Bava's work was predominantly involved with television, such as his Fantaghirò series.

Biography 
Lamberto Bava was born in Rome, Italy on 3 April 1944. Lamberto's father Mario Bava was a film director known primarily as a director of horror films. Lamberto's film career began in the mid-1960s working as an assistant director on his father's film Planet of the Vampires. Lamberto would later collaborate with his father on several of his projects, including Danger: Diabolik (1966), Twitch of the Death Nerve (1971) and Shock (1977) (On Shock, Lamberto Bava was credited as a screenwriter as well as an assistant director.) Besides the work he did with his father, Lamberto also contributed to making films with Italian director Ruggero Deodato, such as Ultimo mondo cannibale (1977) and Cannibal Holocaust (1979). In 1978, Lamberto and Mario directed an episode of the Italian television series I giochi del diavolo (Storie fantastiche dell'Ottocento), a television series with six stories based on 19th century fantastic literature. Their episode was based on La Venere d'Ille by Prosper Mérimée and broadcast on RAI 1 on March 27, 1981.

Early 1980s theatrical films
A meeting with director Pupi Avati led to Bava directing his own feature film Macabre in 1980 which was co-written with Pupi and Antonio Avati. The film stars Bernice Stegers as Jane, a woman who has an affair with a man (Stanko Molnar), who dies. After his death, Jane keeps his severed head in her refrigerator and performs erotic acts with it. According to Lamberto Bava, after seeing Macabre, Mario told him "Now I can die in peace". Mario actually died later in 1980.

Following the release of Macabre, Lamberto Bava worked in advertising and continued to write stories for potential future film projects. He was approached by director Dario Argento to assist him with his giallo film Tenebre (1982), wherein Bava is credited as an assistant director. In 1983, Lamberto Bava directed his second feature film as a director, the giallo film A Blade in the Dark. A Blade in the Dark was originally developed as a television film shot in four 25-minute segments on a very low budget. The film stars Andrea Occhipinti as the music composer Bruno, a man who becomes involved in a series of murders while staying at a secluded villa.

Bava's next two film projects were in different genres than his previous giallo and horror film output. Bava was given a script for Blastfighter, a film originally written as a remake of the Australian film Mad Max with the intention of giving it to director Lucio Fulci. Blastfighter starred Michael Sopkiw as Tiger, a detective who had been released from prison for shooting the man who killed his wife. Tiger moves into the woods with his daughter where he is terrorized by a group of thugs. Lamberto's next film, Monster Shark, was a science fiction film about a mutated shark that goes on a killing spree with two marine biologists attempting to track down the creature to stop it.

Late 1980s theatrical and television films
In 1985, Lamberto Bava reteamed with Dario Argento on the film Demons. Argento co-wrote and produced Bava's film about a theater showing invitation-only screenings of a horror film. In the theater's lobby, a young woman is scratched by a display in the lobby and transforms into a hideous creature who then attacks other audience members, spreading her demonic infection. The film was followed by the sequel Demons 2 in 1986 which had many of the same cast and crew members from Demons. Demons 2 features a television program which causes an outbreak of zombies in an apartment complex. Bava also made the television film Midnight Killer the same year. The film is about a series of murders which are similar to one that was committed 15 years prior, despite the fact that the murderer supposedly died in a fire. Bava makes a cameo in the film as a photographer at the beginning of the film. While working on Midnight Killer, Bava began preparing his next film, Delirium (1987). Delerium stars Serena Grandi as Gioia, a model for Pussycat magazine. Gioia's co-workers end up murdered through bizarre means including pitchforks and bees and then their corpses posed in front of photos of her, which Gioia receives in the mail from the murderer.

Bava returned to television work making several episodes of a series of hour-long films produced by Dario Argento. Bava's episodes included "E ...di Moda la Morte", "Heavy Metal", "Buona Fine È Migliore Principo", "Giubetto Rosso", "Il Bambino Rapito" and "Babbao Natale". In July 1986, the company Reteitalia announced that they would new television films for a series titled Brivido giallo would be directed by Bava. The films were shot between 1987 and 1988 where there were initially going to be a series of five films, it ended up being four. The first was Graveyard Disturbance which was shown at the Sitges Film Festival in 1987 and Until Death which was released on home video in Germany over a year before its television debut in Italy in 1989. The other films in the series were The Ogre and Dinner with a Vampire.

The Brivido giallo series was not popular with critics or audiences which led to Bava's next television films in a series titled Alta tensione which were shot between 1988 and 1989 to be only be released in 1999 on the Mediaset network. One television film made at that time for the series was only released in 2007 on the satellite channel Fantasy TV. Bava also did a remake of Black Sunday for the European television series Sabbath titled La maschera del demonio which premiered in June 1990 at Rome's Fantafestival. Bava began the 1990s with the fairy tale inspired series Fantaghirò series and its many sequels.

Post-1980s works
In 1992, Bava made the film Body Puzzle, which starred Joanna Pacula, who learns that her late husband Abe had a lover named Tim Bell. When Tim learns that Abe was an organ donor, Tim begins killing people in order to rebuild him. Bava also worked in television. In 1991, Bava directed Fantaghiro, a television miniseries that was influenced by films such as Legend, Willow and Ladyhawke. The series was aimed more at family audiences than Bava's previous work and violence is kept to a minimum. The series concluded in 1997 with eight feature-length episodes. Before finishing the series, Bava worked on other television projects, including Desideria, between 1994 and 1995, and a second fantasy series titled Sorellina e il Principe del Sogno (1996). In the late 1990s, Bava made another television film entitled Caraibi. Bava's more later film work includes L'Impero and Ghost Son.

Filmography

Television work

 Turno di notte (Italian TV series)
 Fantaghirò 
 Fantaghirò 2 
 Fantaghirò 3
 The Dragon Ring (television film)
 Fantaghirò 4 (television film)
 Princess Alisea (television film)
 Fantaghirò 5 (television film)
 The Princess and the Pauper 
 Pirates: Blood Brothers 
 Human Currency   (television miniseries)
 Visions of Murder (television film)
 Tailor-Made Murder (television film)
 Kammerspiel (television film)

References

Bibliography

External links

1944 births
Horror film directors
Living people
Giallo film directors
Film directors from Rome